Yorio is a surname. Notable people with the surname include:

Lucas Di Yorio (born 1996), Argentine footballer
María Rosa Yorio (born 1954), Argentine painter, singer, songwriter, and band leader

See also
Morio